Mark O'Reilly (born 1976) is an Irish former Gaelic footballer who played for Summerhill and the Meath county team.

Playing career
O'Reilly was corner back on the Meath team that won the All-Ireland in 1996, beating Mayo after a replay. O'Reilly was named man of the match in the 1999 All-Ireland Senior Football Championship Final win over Cork, his second All-Ireland medal.
O'Reilly was named on the All Star team the same year.

Honours
Meath
 All-Ireland Senior Football Championship (2): 1996, 1999
 Leinster Senior Football Championship (3): 1996, 1999, 2001
 Leinster Under-21 Football Championship (2): 1996, 1997
 Leinster Minor Football Championship (1): 1993

Individual
 All Star Award (1): 1999
 All-Ireland Senior Football Championship Final Man of the Match (1): 1999

References

1976 births
Living people
Meath inter-county Gaelic footballers
Summerhill Gaelic footballers
Winners of two All-Ireland medals (Gaelic football)